Bad Neustadt (Saale) station is a railway station in Bad Neustadt (Saale), Bavaria, Germany.

References

Railway stations in Bavaria
Buildings and structures in Rhön-Grabfeld